Goran Šubara is an Australian football (soccer) player. Šubara is of Serbian descent. He is a versatile footballer who is able to play in the centre of midfield or in defence.

Club career
Šubara showed terrific form for the Bonnyrigg White Eagles in the NSW Super League competition over three seasons managing to secure a 1-year deal with the option of a second year with Gombak United FC.

His ability was further showcased in helping Lautoka F.C. claim victory in the 2008 Inter-District Championship.

Šubara was an important player in his team while playing for PSM Makassar in Indonesia. Problems with the Indonesian FA and a rebel league saw him depart the club and move back to Singapore where his professional career began with Gombak United FC.

He moved to Balestier Khalsa FC after a successful season with the Singapore Armed Forces FC helping them finish in 3rd spot.

Honours

Club
 Bonnyrigg White Eagles
 NSW Super League Champions: 2007
 NSW Super League Premiers: 2008
 Lautoka F.C.
 Inter-District Championship: 2008
 Bangkok Glass
 Thai FA Cup runner-up: 2013

References

External links
 Goran Šubara Interview

1987 births
Living people
Australian soccer players
Expatriate footballers in Fiji
Gombak United FC players
Expatriate footballers in Singapore
Expatriate footballers in Indonesia
Bonnyrigg White Eagles FC players
Australian people of Serbian descent
Australian expatriate soccer players
Australian expatriate sportspeople in Fiji
Australian expatriate sportspeople in Thailand
Australian expatriate sportspeople in Singapore
Australian expatriate sportspeople in Indonesia
Expatriate footballers in Thailand
Expatriate footballers in Malaysia
Warriors FC players
Balestier Khalsa FC players
Singapore Premier League players
Goran Subara
Goran Subara
Goran Subara
Association football defenders